Østerbrogade is the principal shopping street and thoroughfare in the Østerbro district of Copenhagen, Denmark. It extends from Lille Triangel at the north-eastern tip of The Lakes, passes Trianglen, and continues to Svanemøllen station from where it becomes Strandvejen.

History

Østerbrogade originated as the old main road which extended from the Eastern City Gate, paradoxically located north of the city. Originally it was simply known as Østerbro and the name only referred to the stretch between the city gate and present day Trianglen where it continued as Strandvejen (English: The Beach Road) along the coast.

After the city gate was dismantled in 1859 and the city was gradually allowed to develop beyond the old fortifications, still more of the old main road was included in Østerbrogade until it finally reached all the way to its present-day terminus at Svanemøllen in 1949. 

Redevelopment of the area along the road began in 1854 when the Danish Medical Association built the Brumleby terraced houses to provide cheap and healthy housing for indigent workers. In 1857 the first apartment building was built at Trianglen. St. James' Church was built just north of Brumleby from 1872 to 1878.

In 1961, the part of Østerbrogade closest to the city centre, from Østerport Station to Lille Trianglen, was renamed Dag Hammarskjölds Allé but the continuous numbering was retained.

Notable buildings and residents
Østerfælled Torv is a result of a redevelopment of the former Østerfælled Barracks into a mixed-use development surrounding a public space. 

Brumleby (No. 55A) is an enclave of terraced houses  built in two stages in 1854–1872. These are the oldest surviving buildings in Østerbro. Built for indigent workers by the Danish Medical Association, it is one of the earliest examples of social housing in Denmark and became a model for later projects. The oldest part of the development was designed by Michael Gottlieb Bindesbøll. Next to it, on both sides of Olufgade, is one of the developments of the Workers' Co-Operative Building Society. It consists of 49 terraced houses built 1874-1877 to design by Frederik Bøttger.

The development was designed by Michael Gottlieb Bindesbøll and Vilhelm Klein in Neoclassical style.

St James' Church (No. 59), Østerbro's first church, was completed in 1886 to a Neo-Gothic design by Ludvig Fenger.

Vobensgård is a three-winged apartment building is from 1903-05 and was designed by Anton Rosen. It was listed in 1987.

References

External links

Shopping streets in Copenhagen
Streets in Østerbro